Predrag Mihailović (born 24 February 1974) is an Australian water polo coach. He was the head coach of the Australia women's national water polo team at the 2020 Summer Olympics.

References

External links
 

1974 births
Living people
Australian male water polo players
Australian water polo coaches
Australia women's national water polo team coaches
Water polo coaches at the 2020 Summer Olympics